Stoke St. Milborough is a civil parish in Shropshire, England.  It contains 20 listed buildings that are recorded in the National Heritage List for England.  Of these, one is listed at Grade II*, the middle of the three grades, and the others are at Grade II, the lowest grade.  The parish contains the village of Stoke St. Milborough and smaller settlements, and is otherwise rural.  Most of the listed buildings are farmhouses, farm buildings and houses, the earlier of which are timber framed.  The other listed buildings include a church, memorials in the churchyard, two Methodist chapels, and a milepost.


Key

Buildings

References

Citations

Sources

Lists of buildings and structures in Shropshire